Robert Sing (born April 11, 1986) is a Canadian soccer player who played in the Polish I liga for GKP Gorzów Wielkopolski.

Career

Club
He was released from Wisła Płock on 15 August 2011.

References

External links
 

1986 births
Living people
Association football midfielders
Canadian expatriate soccer players
Canadian expatriates in Poland
Canadian soccer players
Expatriate footballers in Poland
Soccer players from Vancouver
Stilon Gorzów Wielkopolski players
Wisła Płock players